This list contains the names of albums that contain a hidden track and also information on how to find them. Not all printings of an album contain the same track arrangements, so some copies of a particular album may not have the hidden track(s) listed below. Some of these tracks may be hidden in the pregap, and some hidden simply as a track following the listed tracks. The list is ordered by artist name using the surname where appropriate.

 XIII, Asylum: After the final track "A Fallen Angel" and 5 minutes of silence, there is a one-minute track of ambiance, deep ghostly moaning, a crying infant, and other demonic sounds. It is unknown whether the hidden track was either left in to fit the song's theme, or to frighten listeners who left the CD player on.
 XTC, Coat of Many Cupboards: On Disc 2, before track 1, there is a short track called "Wanking Man," and on Disc 3, also before track 1, is a lengthy studio jam from The Drunken Jam Sessions titled "Shaving Brush Boogie."
 Xutos & Pontapés, Dados Viciados (1997): A instrumental song is played after the first track.

See also
 List of backmasked messages
 List of albums with tracks hidden in the pregap

References 

X